Sergiu Sîrbu (born Serghei Sîrbu, 28 September 1980) is a Moldovan politician and jurist, who started serving in 2010 as Deputy in the Parliament of Moldova as member of the faction of Democratic Party of Moldova. On 11 July 2014, Sîrbu became Deputy President of the Parliament of Moldova. Sergiu Sîrbu was member of Party of Communists of the Republic of Moldova until 12 December 2012, when he left the party. The same year, Sîrbu is member of Democratic Party of Moldova.

On 19 February 2020 Sergiu Sîrbu, together with a group of MPs, left the faction of the Democrats and the Democratic Party. On 20 February 2020, they announced at the press conference about the establishment of the Pro Moldova parliamentary group.

References

External links
 Sergiu Sîrbu on parlament.md
 Deputatul pe care nunta l-a făcut milionar, 7 aprilie 2014, Ion Preasca, Adevărul 
 Deputatul PCRM S. Sârbu se însoară cu o româncă din București. Vezi pe cine va invita la nuntă, 22 octombrie 2012, Timpul.md 

1980 births
Living people
Democratic Party of Moldova MPs
Moldovan jurists
Politicians from Chișinău